Sonia Katyal is an American legal scholar, professor, and Associate Dean of Faculty Development and Research at UC Berkeley School of Law. Before coming to Berkeley, Katyal was Joseph M. McLaughlin Professor of Law at Fordham University School of Law. Among other topics, her scholarship has focused on racism in consumer branding, the intersection of technology, intellectual property, and civil rights, as well as gender and sexual orientation.

Katyal received her A.B. from Brown University and her J.D. from University of Chicago Law School. Following law school, Katyal worked as an associate at Covington & Burling.

Her brother, Neal Katyal, is also a lawyer, and was the former Acting Solicitor General of the United States.

Publications

References

External links 

 Profile at UC Berkeley School of Law
 

Brown University alumni
University of Chicago Law School alumni
Fordham University faculty
UC Berkeley School of Law faculty
21st-century American women writers
American legal scholars
Year of birth missing (living people)
Living people
American women academics
American academics of Indian descent